Schistura sharavathiensis, sometimes known as the Sharavati loach, is a species of freshwater fish in the family Nemacheilidae. It is endemic to the Sharavathi River basin in the central Western Ghats, India.
 It grows to  standard length.

References

S
Fish described in 2006
Freshwater fish of India
Endemic fauna of the Western Ghats